Laura Fraser (born 24 July 1975) is a Scottish actress. She has played Door in the urban fantasy series Neverwhere, Kate in the film A Knight's Tale, Cat MacKenzie in the BBC Three drama series Lip Service and Lydia Rodarte-Quayle in the AMC crime drama series Breaking Bad and its spin-off Better Call Saul.

Early life
Fraser was born in Glasgow, the daughter of Rose, a college lecturer and nurse, and Alister Fraser, a screenwriter and businessman. She attended Hillhead High School and is a former member of the Scottish Youth Theatre. She trained at the Royal Scottish Academy of Music and Drama.

Career
Fraser's first big break was playing Door in the BBC's dark fantasy series Neverwhere in 1996. She starred in the BBC film The Tribe (1998), and played Lavinia in Titus (1999) as well as Justine in Virtual Sexuality (1999) and Candice in Kevin & Perry Go Large (2000). She also appeared in the films A Knight's Tale (2001) and Vanilla Sky (2001). She starred in the BBC period drama serials He Knew He Was Right (2004), Casanova (2005), and Reichenbach Falls (2007). She starred in the British comedy film Nina's Heavenly Delights (2006). She played Claire Bellington in the ITV series Talk to Me (2007).

Fraser starred as the title character in Florence Nightingale, broadcast on BBC One in June 2008. From 2010 to 2012, she starred as Cat in the BBC Three series Lip Service. In 2010, it was announced that she would portray Jessica Brody in the pilot for the Showtime political thriller series Homeland. She was replaced on the show by Morena Baccarin. From 2012 to 2013, she portrayed Lydia Rodarte-Quayle in the final season of the AMC crime drama series Breaking Bad. She has made occasional appearances as the same character in the prequel Better Call Saul.

She played Eve Stone in the 2016 television series The Missing. She played DI Juliet Wallace in the 2016 BBC miniseries One of Us. In 2017, Fraser starred as DS Annie Redford in the six-part ITV drama The Loch. In November 2019, the BBC announced her as a guest star for the twelfth series of Doctor Who. She appeared as 'Kane' in the third episode "Orphan 55" in January 2020.

Personal life
Fraser is a teetotaller. She married Irish-born American actor Karl Geary in 2003. They have one daughter, Lila, and live in Glasgow, Scotland.

Filmography

Film

Television

References

External links

1975 births
Living people
20th-century Scottish actresses
21st-century Scottish actresses
Actresses from Glasgow
Alumni of the Royal Conservatoire of Scotland
British expatriate actresses in the United States
People educated at Hillhead High School
Scottish expatriates in the United States
Scottish film actresses
Scottish television actresses